In the Name of Love is a 2011 Filipino romantic drama film directed by Olivia Lamasan and starring Aga Muhlach, Angel Locsin, and Jake Cuenca. The film is a part of the special presentation for Star Cinema's 18th anniversary. The film premiered on May 11, 2011. It is produced and released by Star Cinema.

Plot 
With barely anything to live for, Emman Toledo (Aga Muhlach), a former dancer, is just about to start his life all over again. He holds the good memories of his past dearly, knowing he will never be able to bring back his better days. An unlikely opportunity comes up when he is assigned to be the dance instructor for the upcoming Governor's Ball of the powerful political family of the Evelinos, a chance for him to rekindle his lost passion.

It will be at this ball where the engagement of the governor's son, Dylan Evelino (Jake Cuenca), and Cedes Fernandez (Angel Locsin) will be announced. Despite her hatred for the dirty politics, Cedes has no choice but to succumb to the decision of Dylan out of her indebtedness towards the family.

Emman is drawn towards Cedes from the first time she catches his eye. As their lives intertwine through dance, Emman and Cedes find themselves resisting an affair: one that holds the truths to their painful pasts, and the memories of a boundless love. Pursuing their feelings for each other will only set fire to the dangers and trappings of their love, so much so that their love could cost them their lives. Can the strength of their love overcome the powers of the dangers surrounding them?

Cast

Main cast 

Aga Muhlach as Emman Toledo/Garry Fernandez
Angel Locsin as Mercedes "Cedes" Fernandez
Jake Cuenca as Dylan Evelino

Supporting cast 
Carmi Martin as Chloe Evelino
Ryan Eigenmann as Homer Evelino
Smokey Manoloto as Patrick
Leo Rialp as Gov. Tony Evelino
Kat Alano as Rita Evelino
Emilio Garcia as Dan
Bobby Andrews as Neil
Dimples Romana as Emily
Michael Flores as Toby
Joshua Zamora as Jojo
Nanding Josef as Mayor Boborol
Maliksi Morales as Otap
Paul Salas as Migo
Dante Rivero as Roger

Reception

Launch 
The film's trailer was released on April 20, 2011, on the film's official website. The trailer included scenes that were shot in Tokyo, Japan and the theme song of the film is "(Where Do I Begin?) Love Story", which was sung by Gary Valenciano.

Box office 
The film placed at the 15th spot in a Top 20 list of movies worldwide with the highest gross on the week of May 11, 2011, to May 18, 2011. It grossed $1,917,443 (approximately P84 million) in the box office, as reported by the Associated Press on May 19.

International screenings 
The film had international premieres in two cities in the United States, both in the state of California. One on May 28, 2011, in Los Angeles and on May 29, 2011, in San Francisco.

Accolades

References

External links 
 

Philippine dance films
Philippine romantic drama films
Filipino-language films
Star Cinema films
Films directed by Olivia Lamasan
Films shot in Tokyo